Italia in Miniatura (Italy in miniature) is a leisure and miniature park in Viserba, a part of Rimini (Italy).

The park displays 273 miniatures of famous Italian and European buildings in scale 1:25 and 1:50. The area is surrounded by Arcobaleno (Italian: rainbow), a monorail. 10,000 plants and 5,000 miniature trees are integrated in the landscape. To fill the water basins 2,500 m3 of water are needed. 17 miniature trains are running in the system.

On an area of 12,000 m2 there is a replica of the Grand Canal of Venice with reproductions of 119 buildings in scale of 1:5. The campanile on St. Mark's Square has a height of 20 metres.

In Cannonacqua, a replica of the Castel Sismondo in Rimini, medieval battles between the noble families of Montefeltro and Malatesta with water cannons can be replayed.

There are also the log flume Canoe, the parrot park Pappamondo, as well as the Luna Park della scienza with physical experiments for children. Since 2011 the project YouMini miniaturizes parc visitors in scale 1:33.

The park opens daily from March to September. it is situated right at the Strada Statale Adriatica 16 about 5 km north of the centre of Rimini.

Image gallery

External links 

 Official site
 Site of Luna Park della scienza

Miniature parks
Buildings and structures in Rimini
1970 establishments in Italy
Amusement parks in Italy
Tourist attractions in Emilia-Romagna
Amusement parks opened in 1970